Pulaski Township is one of the twelve townships of Williams County, Ohio, United States.  The 2000 census found 2,628 people in the township.

Geography
Located in the southern part of the county, it borders the following townships:
Jefferson Township - north
Brady Township - northeast corner
Springfield Township - east
Tiffin Township, Defiance County - southeast corner
Washington Township, Defiance County - south
Farmer Township, Defiance County - southwest corner
Center Township - west
Superior Township - northwest corner

Most of Bryan, the county seat and only city of Williams County, is located in western Pulaski Township, and the census-designated place of Pulaski lies in the township's north.

Name and history
The township was named for Count Casimir Pulaski, an American Revolutionary War soldier. It is the only Pulaski Township statewide.

Government
The township is governed by a three-member board of trustees, who are elected in November of odd-numbered years to a four-year term beginning on the following January 1. Two are elected in the year after the presidential election and one is elected in the year before it. There is also an elected township fiscal officer, who serves a four-year term beginning on April 1 of the year after the election, which is held in November of the year before the presidential election. Vacancies in the fiscal officership or on the board of trustees are filled by the remaining trustees.

References

External links
County website

Townships in Williams County, Ohio
Townships in Ohio